Sheikh Manzar Masood was an Azad Kashmiri politician who served as  President of Azad Kashmir. Mr. Masood was the founder speaker of AJK assembly. He remained a speaker of AJK assembly for a term of five years. He became the president of AJK in April 1975 for a shorter period (16 April to 5 June). Later on he became the advisor of Parliamentary affairs to the then-prime minister Zulfiqar Ali Bhutto . He served as an advisor for two years until the military coup in Pakistan. He was arrested in 1977 by Pakistan Army. He remained a member of assembly for four terms and his wife remained member of assembly and advisor to the Government for three terms.
His son Dr Ahsan Masud is actively involved in politics. He is serving the community for the last fifteen years and remained advisor to the prime minister Chaudhry Abdul majeed. Nowadays Dr.Ahsan Masud is secretary General of Peoples party AJK Punjab.

References

Pakistani politicians
Possibly living people
Year of birth missing